House of Representatives is the name of legislative bodies in many countries and sub-national entitles.  In many countries, the House of Representatives is the lower house of a bicameral legislature, with the corresponding upper house often called a "Senate". In some countries, the House of Representatives is the sole chamber of a unicameral legislature. 

The functioning of a house of representatives can vary greatly from country to country, and depends on whether a country has a parliamentary or a presidential system. Members of a House of Representatives are typically apportioned according to population rather than geography.

National legislatures
The Indonesian People's Representative Council (Dewan Perwakilan Rakyat, DPR) is generally known in English as the "House of Representatives", as is the Dewan Rakyat of the Parliament of Malaysia and the Dáil Éireann of the Irish Oireachtas parliament.

"The House of Representatives" currently is the name of a house of the legislature in the following countries:

In the following countries it is the sole chamber in a unicameral system:

Subnational legislatures
House of Representatives is the title of most, but not all, of the lower houses of U.S. state legislatures, with the exceptions usually called "State Assembly", "General Assembly", or more rarely, "House of Delegates".

In Germany, the Landtag parliament of the city and state of Berlin (previously of West Berlin), the Abgeordnetenhaus is known in English as the House of Representatives.

In Tanzania, the semi-autonomous islands of Zanzibar has its own legislative body, the Zanzibar House of Representatives.

Defunct Houses of Representatives
From 1867 until 1918, in Cisleithania, the Austrian part of the Austro-Hungarian monarchy, the lower house of the Imperial Council (Reichsrat) parliament, the Abgeordnetenhaus was generally known in English as "House of Representatives". Since 1855 the lower house in the Landtag assembly of Prussia was called Abgeordnetenhaus, as distinct from the upper House of Lords.

In 1934, the Nebraska voters approved a unicameral legislature dissolving the House of Representatives and transferring its powers to the Senate.

The Kenyan House of Representatives was combined with the Senate in 1966, to form an enlarged single chamber parliament, known as the National Assembly. The Senate was re-established as an upper house following the 2010 Kenyan constitutional referendum.

Under the First and Second Republics, the National Assembly of South Korea was officially bicameral, consisting of the House of Councillors and House of Representatives. In practice, however, the National Assembly was unicameral under the First Republic, as the first election of the House of Councillors was not held until the Second Republic was founded in 1960. Following a military coup the following year, the National Assembly was dissolved. Since its restoration in December 1963, the National Assembly has been unicameral.

The House of Representatives of Ceylon (now Sri Lanka) was the lower chamber of the parliament established in 1947 according to the Soulbury Constitution. The 1972 First Republican Constitution of Sri Lanka replaced it with the unicameral National State Assembly.

Following the surrender of South Vietnam to North Vietnamese and Viet Cong forces in 1975, a Provisional Revolutionary Government established itself in Saigon and disbanded the bicameral National Assembly consisting of the Senate and the House of Representatives. 

Under apartheid, the House of Representatives was the house for South Africa's mixed race 'Coloured' community, in the Tricameral Parliament of 1984 to 1994.

In 1994 the House of Representatives of the Gambia was dissolved in a coup d'état led by Yahya Jammeh. It was replaced as the legislature by the National Assembly according to the 1997 Constitution of The Gambia.

See also
List of legislatures by country
Chamber of Deputies
National Assembly
House of Commons

Legislatures